Glasco is a hamlet (and census-designated place) in Ulster County, New York, United States. The population was 2,013 at the 2020 census.

Glasco is a community in the Town of Saugerties east of U.S. Route 9W. The community is north of Kingston.

Geography
Glasco is located at  (42.047539, -73.952860).

Glasco is on the west bank of the Hudson River.

History

Glasco's name was taken from a glass company located in the mountain area several miles inland.  The glass was carried by horse down the "Glasco Turnpike" to the banks of the Hudson where it was shipped on for ports of sale. The settlement along the river where the glass was loaded became known as Glasco.

Settled largely by unskilled workers, first from Ireland and then from Italy, they came to the area in great numbers in the late 19th century by ferry after landing in New York City. They tended to live in company housing on the banks of the river. At one point, the town boasted over six brick factories, a ferry service, a school, churches and several saloons. Bricks were sent down the Hudson River by barge to furnish the construction of America's cities. The Hudson River also played a role in other economic activities.  Some entrepreneurial immigrants opened small businesses to service the community, such as harvesting ice from the Hudson River, which was stored in large ice houses along the banks of the river and sold in the summers to homes and businesses. Fishing was also a cottage industry among those not working in the brickyards. In the bluffs above the clay mining operations of the brickyards, small estates and dairy farms were established.

By the mid 20th century, the brick yards had all closed down. One family operator, Washburn, allegedly relocated to Virginia to continue brick making. Other brickyards were abandoned and simply vanished into the undergrown of trees and wildlife.

Recently, residents of New York City have begun to purchase weekend homes within the boundaries of Glasco. At the foot of the Catskill Mountains, and within walking distance of the Hudson River (relatively unpolluted at that point), the hamlet has seen real estate prices skyrocket since 2000, along with an increase in single-family home construction.

Demographics

As of the census of 2000, there were 1,692 people, 700 households, and 476 families residing in the CDP. The population density was 915.0 per square mile (353.1/km2). There were 726 housing units at an average density of 392.6/sq mi (151.5/km2). The racial makeup of the CDP was 95.86% White, 1.48% African American, 0.06% Native American, 0.65% Asian, 0.35% from other races, and 1.60% from two or more races. Hispanic or Latino of any race were 1.89% of the population.

There were 700 households, out of which 29.6% had children under the age of 18 living with them, 51.7% were married couples living together, 11.6% had a female householder with no husband present, and 31.9% were non-families. 26.3% of all households were made up of individuals, and 10.7% had someone living alone who was 65 years of age or older. The average household size was 2.40 and the average family size was 2.91.

In the CDP, the population was spread out, with 23.1% under the age of 18, 5.7% from 18 to 24, 30.9% from 25 to 44, 22.6% from 45 to 64, and 17.6% who were 65 years of age or older. The median age was 39 years. For every 100 females, there were 90.5 males. For every 100 females age 18 and over, there were 88.6 males.

The median income for a household in the CDP was $37,917, and the median income for a family was $45,909. Males had a median income of $32,917 versus $23,696 for females. The per capita income for the CDP was $21,964. About 11.5% of families and 9.3% of the population were below the poverty line, including 17.1% of those under age 18 and 6.6% of those age 65 or over.

References

Census-designated places in New York (state)
Census-designated places in Ulster County, New York
Hamlets in New York (state)
Hamlets in Ulster County, New York
New York (state) populated places on the Hudson River